Diana Ross & the Supremes Join the Temptations is, as the title implies, a collaborative album combining Motown's two best selling groups, Diana Ross & the Supremes and the Temptations. Issued by Motown in late 1968 to coincide with the broadcast of the Supremes/Temptations TCB television special, the album was a success, reaching #2 on the Billboard 200. Diana Ross & the Supremes Join the Temptations spent four weeks at number one on the UK Albums Chart.

Background
Originally the lead single was to have been "The Impossible Dream" as featured in the climax to the TV spectacular TCB. However, it was decided to release "I'm Gonna Make You Love Me" as a single instead even though it was not featured on TCB. This became a number-two hit on both the Billboard Hot 100 and the R&B charts, and the follow-up, "I'll Try Something New", was a Top 30 hit. A third single, "I Second That Emotion", was released exclusively in the United Kingdom, where it became a Top 20 hit.

However, a true reflection of "I'm Gonna Make You Love Me"'s popularity was that it was certified platinum and was the #1 single on both Cash Box and Record World (three weeks). By rights, this should be credited as yet another #1 single for both Diana Ross and The Supremes and the Temptations. It was produced by Frank Wilson and Nick Ashford - without his songwriting partner-wife Valerie Simpson.

Diana Ross & the Supremes Join the Temptations marks the first on-record appearance of new Temptations lead singer Dennis Edwards, who was brought in as David Ruffin's replacement in July 1968.

During December 1968, Motown experienced a period of exceptional success. The label had 5 of the Top 10 singles in one week including "Love Child" by Diana Ross and The Supremes, "Cloud Nine" by the Temptations, "I Heard it Through the Grapevine" by Marvin Gaye, "For Once in My Life" by Stevie Wonder and, of course, "I'm Gonna Make You Love Me" by arguably the first soul/pop super group, Diana Ross and The Supremes with the Temptations. Not only that, but the corresponding albums, by each individual artists ranked in the Top 10, TCB, Diana Ross & The Supremes Join the Temptations by the respective groups held down the #1 and #2 albums. Cloud Nine by the Temptations, Love Child by Diana Ross and The Supremes, For Once in My Life by Stevie Wonder, M.P.G. by Marvin Gaye, and Time Out by Smokey Robinson and The Miracles which featured the lightning speed growth of the soon to be Top 10 single, "Baby, Baby Don't Cry".

Composition
All of the tracks on the album are covers of songs by other artists. Both "I Second That Emotion" and "I'll Try Something New" were originally recorded by Motown's Smokey Robinson & the Miracles, while "I'm Gonna Make You Love Me" was an outside single release by both Dee Dee Warwick and Madeline Bell before it became a hit for the Supremes and Temptations. Motown's Marvin Gaye had previously had hits with "Try It Baby" and, as a duet with Tammi Terrell, "Ain't No Mountain High Enough". "This Guy's in Love with You" was a hit for both Dionne Warwick and Herb Alpert & the Tijuana Brass, while "Funky Broadway" had been recorded as a hit for Dyke & the Blazers and Wilson Pickett. The Sweet Inspirations' signature song, "Sweet Inspiration", is also covered here, as is Stevie Wonder's "A Place in the Sun", The Four Tops' "Then", and the show tune "The Impossible Dream" from Man of La Mancha.

Frank Wilson served as executive producer of the project. Diana Ross & the Supremes Join the Temptations, joint-recorded at both the main Hitsville USA studio in Detroit, Michigan, the Golden World studio in Detroit, and satellite studios in Los Angeles, primarily features leads by Diana Ross of the Supremes and Eddie Kendricks of the Temptations, with additional leads by Temptations Dennis Edwards, Paul Williams, Otis Williams (on "this Guy's In Love With You"), and Melvin Franklin.

Track listing
Diana Ross shares lead vocals on each track with one or more of the Temptations, identified by superscripts: (a) Eddie Kendricks, (b) Dennis Edwards, (c) Paul Williams, (d) Melvin Franklin, and/or (e) Otis Williams.

Side one
"Try It Baby" (Berry Gordy) d, c – 3:42
"I Second That Emotion" (Smokey Robinson, Al Cleveland) a – 2:19
"Ain't No Mountain High Enough" (Nickolas Ashford, Valerie Simpson) b – 2:16
"I'm Gonna Make You Love Me" (Kenneth Gamble, Leon Huff, Jerry Ross) a, e – 3:06
"This Guy's in Love With You" (Burt Bacharach, Hal David) e – 3:48
"Funky Broadway" (Arlester Christian) b – 2:32

Side two
"I'll Try Something New" (Robinson) a – 2:20
"A Place in the Sun" (Ron Miller, Bryan Wells) c – 3:29
"Sweet Inspiration" (Dan Penn, Spooner Oldham) a – 2:55
"Then" (Robinson, Bobby Rogers, Pete Moore) c – 2:12
"The Impossible Dream" (Joe Darion, Mitch Leigh) c – 4:47

Known outtakes
All of the following songs were recorded for this album, but not included for the final track listing. These tracks can be found on Joined Together: The Complete Studio Duets, a 2004 Motown CD set combining this LP and its follow-up, Together.
 Opening Medley (Holland–Dozier–Holland) (on the intro: a, b, c, d, e)
"When the Lovelight Starts Shining Through His Eyes"
"Come See About Me"
"Stop! In the Name of Love"
"Love Is Like an Itching in My Heart"
"You Keep Me Hangin' On"
"Got to Get You into My Life" (John Lennon, Paul McCartney) *
"You Can't Hurry Love"/"You Keep Me Hangin' On" (Holland–Dozier–Holland)
"You Gave Me Something (and Everything's Alright)" (William Garrett, Albert Hamilton, Ronnie Savoy, Norma Toney) c
"A House Is Not a Home" (Bacharach, David) a, c*
"If You Should Walk Away" (Frank Wilson, Gordy)
"Amen" (Jester Hairston) a, b, c**

(*) Supremes member Mary Wilson shares a lead on this track. (**) Mary Wilson and Cindy Birdsong also have leads on this track.

Personnel 
Frank Wilson, producer (H. B. Barnum, arranger) - "Try It Baby" and "The Impossible Dream"
Frank Wilson and Nickolas Ashford, producers (Paul Riser, arranger) - "I'm Gonna Make You Love Me", "A Place in the Sun" and "Sweet Inspirations"
Frank Wilson and Deke Richards, producers (Gene Page, arranger) - "This Guy's in Love with You", "Funky Broadway" and "I'll Try Something New"
Smokey Robinson, Al Cleveland and Terry Johnson, producers (Paul Riser, arranger) - "I Second That Emotion" and "Then"
Henry Cosby, producer (Paul Riser, arranger) - "Ain't No Mountain High Enough"
Mary Wilson, Cindy Birdsong, Dennis Edwards, Eddie Kendricks, Paul Williams, Melvin Franklin, Otis Williams and The Andantes - background vocals

Instrumentation on "Try It Baby", "This Guy's in Love With You", "Funky Broadway", "I'll Try Something New" and "The Impossible Dream" is performed by Los Angeles area session musicians. On all other tracks, the instrumentation is provided by Motown's studio band, The Funk Brothers, with strings and horns by the Detroit Symphony Orchestra.

Singles history
"I'm Gonna Make You Love Me" b/w "A Place in the Sun" (Motown 1137, November 21, 1968)
"I'll Try Something New" b/w "The Way You Do the Things You Do" (b-side taken from TCB) (Motown 1142, February 20, 1969)
"I Second That Emotion" b/w "The Way You Do the Things You Do" (b-side taken from TCB) (Tamla-Motown 709, United Kingdom only, September 1969)

Charts

Weekly charts

Year-end charts

Certifications

References

1968 albums
The Supremes albums
The Temptations albums
Collaborative albums
Covers albums
Motown albums
Albums arranged by Gene Page
Albums arranged by Paul Riser
Albums arranged by H. B. Barnum
Albums produced by Smokey Robinson
Albums produced by Frank Wilson (musician)
Albums produced by Henry Cosby
Albums produced by Al Cleveland
Albums produced by Deke Richards
Albums recorded at Hitsville U.S.A.
Albums produced by Nickolas Ashford
Albums produced by Terry "Buzzy" Johnson